Steniolia is a genus of sand wasps in the family Crabronidae. There are about 15 described species in Steniolia.

Species
 Steniolia californiensis Gillaspy, 1964
 Steniolia dissimilis C. Fox, 1923
 Steniolia duplicata Provancher, 1888
 Steniolia elegans J. Parker, 1929
 Steniolia eremica Gillaspy, 1964
 Steniolia guatemalensis (Rohwer, 1914)
 Steniolia longirostra (Say, 1837)
 Steniolia mexicana Gillaspy, 1964
 Steniolia nigripes J. Parker, 1917
 Steniolia obliqua (Cresson, 1865)
 Steniolia powelli Gillaspy, 1964
 Steniolia scolopacea Handlirsch, 1889
 Steniolia sulfurea W. Fox, 1901
 Steniolia tibialis Handlirsch, 1889
 Steniolia vanduzeei Gillaspy, 1964

References

Further reading

 
 
 

Crabronidae